Haukim is a pre-Islamic deity who was originally worshipped in Qataban, in what is now South Arabia. He was concerned with arbitration and the law. He is often mentioned together with Anbay, another god of justice.

References

Arabian gods
Justice gods
South Arabia